Annemarie Mikkers (born 13 May 1973) is a Dutch former professional tennis player.

Mikkers reached a best singles ranking of world No. 461, with her only ITF title coming at Rabat in 1995. She achieved a career-high ranking of 223 in doubles and featured in the doubles main-draw in three editions of the Rosmalen WTA Tour tournament. On the ITF Circuit, Mikkers won a total of six doubles titles, including a $25k tournament in Rheda-Wiedenbrück.

ITF finals

Singles (1–0)

Doubles (6–8)

References

External links
 
 

1973 births
Living people
Dutch female tennis players
20th-century Dutch women